South Africa  competed at the 2019 World Aquatics Championships in Gwangju, South Korea from 12 to 28 July.

Medalists

Artistic swimming

South Africa has entered 12 artistic swimmers.

Women

 Legend: (R) = Reserve Athlete

Diving

South Africa has entered two divers.

Women

Open water swimming

South Africa qualified four male and two female open water swimmers.

Men

Women

Mixed

Swimming

South Africa has entered 18 swimmers.

Men

Women

Mixed

Water polo

Men's tournament

Team roster

Madi Lwazi
Etienne Le Roux (C)
Timothy Rezelman
Nardus Badenhorst
Ethan Coryndon-Baker
Sven van Zyl
Jason Evezard
Nicholas Rodda
Dylan Cronje
Mark Spencer
Liam Neill
Donn Stewart
Keegan Clark
Coach: Paul Martin

Group C

Playoffs

9th–12th place semifinals

11th place game

Women's tournament

Team roster

Lauren Nixon
Yanah Gerber
Nthatisi Mota
Emma Joubert
Georgia Moir
Amica Hallendorff (C)
Lucy Miszewski
Kate Hinrichs
Jordan Wedderburn
Nicola Macleod
Chloe Meecham
Christine Abrahamse
Zanne Smit
Coach: Pierre le Roux

Group A

13th–16th place semifinals

13th place game

References

World Aquatics Championships
Nations at the 2019 World Aquatics Championships
2019